Lee Seung-hee (born 10 June 1988) is a South Korean footballer who played for Jeonnam Dragons.

Career
Lee was released by Nagoya Grampus, along with 8 other players, on 10 November 2016 following the club's relegation to J2 League.

References

External links 

1988 births
Living people
South Korean footballers
Jeonnam Dragons players
Jeju United FC players
K League 1 players
Lee Seung-hee
J1 League players
Nagoya Grampus players
Pohang Steelers players
Fujairah FC players
UAE Pro League players
Expatriate footballers in Thailand
South Korean expatriate sportspeople in Thailand
Expatriate footballers in the United Arab Emirates
South Korean expatriate sportspeople in the United Arab Emirates
Lee Seung-hee
Association football midfielders